John Lewis Linehan (born May 1, 1978) is an American former professional basketball player and currently an assistant basketball coach for the Saint Joseph's Hawks.  At 5'9" and 165 lbs., he played at the point guard position. He was nicknamed, "Le Virus" (English: "The Virus").

High school
Born in Chester, Pennsylvania, Linehan played competitive high school basketball, first at Chester High School, and then at Winchendon School, in Winchendon, Massachusetts.

College career
Linehan played college basketball for Providence College's Friars, from 1997 to 2002. He led the Big East Conference in steals, in three different seasons, and also earned the Big East Defensive Player of the Year and second-team All-Big East honors his last two seasons.  As a senior, in the 2001–02 season, he averaged 12.5 points, 3.8 rebounds, 4.4 assists, and 4.5 steals per game, finishing second in the nation in steals.

As a result, he was awarded the Henry Iba Corinthian Award, as the National Association of Basketball Coaches' Defensive Player of the Year, for that season. He finished his collegiate career as the NCAA Division I's all-time career leader in steals, with 385. On December 5, 2021, Richmond's Jacob Gilyard broke Linehan's nearly 20-year old record after recording his 386th steal in a win over Northern Iowa.

Professional playing career
Linehan was not drafted into the National Basketball Association (NBA).  He played for the Greenville Groove, of the National Basketball Development League (NBDL). In the 2003–04 season, he played for the Dakota Wizards of the Continental Basketball Association (CBA), and won the league's championship with the team.

After winning the CBA championship, Linehan moved to Europe, and signed with Paris Basket Racing of the LNB Pro A in France, where he also played two years (2006–08) for SLUC Nancy. In the 2008–09 season, he played for Kalev/Cramo, in Estonia. With the team, he won the Estonian Cup and the Estonian League championship.

In July 2009, he signed a one-year contract with the French Pro A team Cholet Basket. He won the 2009–10 season's French League championship with the team.

In July 2010, Linehan signed a contract with the French club SLUC Nancy, and in the 2010–11 season, he won the French League championship with them. Linehan at one time held the record for the most assists in a single EuroLeague game, with 15 assists. On the 3 November 2011, he delivered 15 assists, in a EuroLeague game against Fenerbahçe. The record was later broken.

Coaching career
Linehan began his career as a basketball coach in 2015.

In July 2017, it was announced that Linehan would join the coaching staff at Hartford.
In May 2019, it was announced that Linehan would join the coaching staff at the University of Georgia. Linehan was named an assistant coach at Saint Joseph's University on April 22, 2022.

See also
 List of NCAA Division I men's basketball players with 11 or more steals in a game
 List of NCAA Division I men's basketball career steals leaders

References

External links
Euroleague.net Profile
Eurobasket.com Profile
French League Profile 
Twitter

1978 births
Living people
American expatriate basketball people in Estonia
American expatriate basketball people in France
American men's basketball coaches
American men's basketball players
Basketball coaches from Pennsylvania
Basketball players from Pennsylvania
BC Kalev/Cramo players
Brown Bears men's basketball coaches
Cholet Basket players
Dakota Wizards (CBA) players
Drexel Dragons men's basketball coaches
Georgia Bulldogs basketball coaches
Greenville Groove players
Harlem Globetrotters players
Hartford Hawks men's basketball coaches
Paris Racing Basket players
Point guards
Providence Friars men's basketball players
SIG Basket players
SLUC Nancy Basket players
Sportspeople from Chester, Pennsylvania